HHole for Mannheim (2006-∞) was a permanent multimedia installation in the "Athene-Trakt" of the Kunsthalle Mannheim created by NatHalie Braun Barends.

The Kunsthalle is  under reconstruction; the installation was removed. Following a legal dispute and a decision of a German Federal Court which stated that the removal of the work does not infringe the artist's intellectual property rights, the installation will most likely not be rebuilt afterwards.

Description 
HHole for Mannheim (2006-∞) has been conceived as a permanent, conceptual, site specific, developing artwork in progress.
It consists of seven holes which pass through the Athene Trakt that unites the old (Billing-Bau) and the new building (Mitzlaff-Bau) of the Mannheim Kunsthalle.

The natural light flows from the topmost hole above the museum rooftop, through the holes in the floors below, meeting the light projected upwards from a Gobo projector located at the lowest floor. At the rooftop, a custom designed laser light (also used by astronomers to point at stars), projects into the universe the artist's symbol of the HMap. The natural and the artificial lights meet again symbolically at the antipodes of the museum, close to New Zealand at 49° 28′ 56.68″ S, 171° 31′ 29.63″ E.

Seven rooms contain the seven holes, starting from above: Infinite Room, Phoenix Room, Reflection Room, Silence Room, Treasure Room, Ground Room, and Earth Room.

Each room hosts different installations, with videos, HHole specially designed acrylic furniture, waterfall, living tree, pool, and telephone to connect each level.

References

External links

 Die Welt 25/04/2015 - Und ich sage, dieses Loch ist Kunst
 RNF Reportage about NatHalie Braun Barends, HHole and PHaradise
 FAZ 06/02/2015 about HHole for Mannheim 2006 - ∞
 SWR Reportage about NatHalie Braun Barends, HHole and PHaradise
 Book HHole for Mannheim 2006 - ∞
 Kunsthalle Program Jan Feb 2007
 Kunsthalle Program Marz April 2007
 Kunsthalle Program Mai Juni 100 Jahre 2007
 Kunsthalle Program HHole for Mannheim 2006 - ∞ Juli August 2007
 PresseInfo Kunsthalle Mannheim 100 Yahre
 Alfred Huber: Im Paradies der Farben. 12 March 2007. Mannheimer Morgen
 Peter W. Ragge: Lichterglanz auf gewebtem Metall. March 2007 Mannheimer Morgen
 Philipp Pöhlert-Brackrock: Lichtinstallation zum Geburtstag Allgemeine Zeitung
 Annika Wind: Wenn Werke in den Himmel wachsen Mannheimer Morgen
 Eva Meyer: HHole for Mannheim.  6/12/2006. Zeitschrift
 Peter W. Ragge: Der Blickwinkel weiten. July 2006 Mannheimer Morgen
 Barbara Förster: Von Porno-Studio zum Akt-Kabinett. Sept 2006 Mannheimer Morgen
 Kristina Pröpper Skandaliesierunt. Nov 2006 Mannheimer Morgen
 Peter Kiefer: Kunst Loch.
 Julia Ranniko: Dem Brandschutz geschuldet. Deutsche Press Agentur 
 Art - Das Kunstmagazin
 Axel Springer - Die Welt
 Jens O. Brelle - Art Lawyer Magazin
 Julia Ranniko - Wormser Zeitung 
 HHole for Mannheim 2006 - ∞

Installation art works
Light art
Conceptual art